James or Jim Wood may refer to:

Politics and government 
 James Wood (governor) (1741–1813), Governor of Virginia and officer in the American Revolutionary War
 James Wood (New York politician) (1820–1892), New York politician and Union Army general
 James Wood (Irish politician) (1865–1936), Member of Parliament for East Down, 1902–1906
 Jim Wood (California politician) (born 1960), member of the California State Assembly
 Jim Wood (Arkansas politician) (fl. late 20th century), State Auditor of Arkansas
 Sebastian Wood (James Sebastian Lamin Wood, born 1961), British Ambassador to Germany

Sport 
 James Wood (footballer) (1893–?), professional footballer, who played for South Shields, Huddersfield Town and Blackpool
 Jamie Wood (born 1978), footballer
 Jimmy Wood (1842–1927), American baseball player and manager
 Jim Wood (American football) (born 1936), American gridiron football player and coach
 James Wood (South African cricketer) (born 1985), South African cricketer, played for Durham UCCE
 James Wood (Lancashire cricketer) (1933–1977), English cricketer for Lancashire 1954–56
 James Wood (New Zealand cricketer) (1854–1937), New Zealand cricketer
 Jim Wood (Sussex cricketer) (1914–1989), English cricketer, played for Sussex 1936–55
 Jim Wood (biathlete) (born 1952), British Olympic biathlete
 James Wood (baseball)

Religion  
 James Wood (mathematician) (1760–1839), Dean of Ely 1820–1839
 James Wood (minister) (1672–1759), Presbyterian minister of Atherton and Chowbent Chapels in Atherton, Greater Manchester, England
 James Frederick Wood (1813–1883), Archbishop of Philadelphia
 James Julius Wood (1800–1877), Scottish minister

Military 
 James Wood (Canadian admiral) (born 1934), Canadian admiral
 James Athol Wood (1756–1829), British rear-admiral
 James W. Wood (1924–1990), U.S. Air Force colonel and senior test pilot on the Dyna-Soar program
 Sir James Wood, 2nd Baronet (died 1738), Scottish officer of the Dutch States Army and later the British Army
 James Wood (Royal Navy officer) (died 1860), commander of HMS Pandora during its commission at the Royal Navy's Pacific Station

Others 
 James Wood (musician) (born 1953), British composer and percussionist
 James Wood (critic) (born 1965), British literary critic and novelist
 James Wood (encyclopaedist) (1820–1901), British editor of The Nuttall Encyclopaedia
 James Wood, Lord Irwin (born 1977), British courtesy peer
 James Edward Wood (1947–2004), American murderer
 James N. Wood (1941–2010), American director of the Art Institute of Chicago
 James Roland Wood (born 1941), Australian Royal Commissioner and jurist
 James Rushmore Wood (1816–1882), American physician
 Jim Wood (fiddler) (born 1964), American fiddler
 James Wood (engineer), American engineer
 James Wood Bush (c. 1844–1906), Hawaiian-American Civil War combatant
 James Wood (screenwriter), British screenwriter

See also 
 James Woods (disambiguation)